Matman is the capital town of Matman Township, Shan State, Myanmar. It is part of the Wa Self-Administered Division.

Geography
Matman is located in a small valley about 15 km east of the Salween.

Further reading
 Matman Township - Shan State - Mimu
 Shan (North) State, Myanmar - Mimu

References

Populated places in Shan State
Township capitals of Myanmar